The United States Office on Violence Against Women (OVW) was created following the Violence Against Women Act (VAWA) of 1994. The Act was renewed in 2005, 2013 and again in 2022. The Violence Against Women Act legislation requires the Office on Violence Against Women to work to respond to and reduce violence against women in many different areas, including on college campuses and in people's homes. VAWA requires Office on Violence Against Women to administer justice and strengthen services for victims of domestic violence, dating violence, sexual assault, and stalking.

The Office on Violence Against Women is headed by a director, who is appointed by the President and confirmed by the Senate. The principal deputy director serves directly under the director, as do the deputy directors. Until January 2017, Bea Hanson, Ph.D., was the acting director and principal deputy director. When Hanson resigned in January 2017, Deputy Director Nadine M. Neufville became acting director.

As an office in the United States Department of Justice, the Office on Violence Against Women receives federal funding for federal grants that are awarded to communities across America. These grants are used to create successful partnerships between federal, state, tribal, and local authorities as well as provide helpful services to victims of domestic violence, dating violence, sexual assault, and stalking. During fiscal year 2017, Office on Violence Against Women awarded $450,000,000 of grants. For example, Sexual Assault Services Program assists victims of sexual assault and family members affected by it. Since its inception, Office on Violence Against Women has awarded over $6 billion in grants directed towards such projects.

Organization
The Office on Violence Against Women is headed by a director. The orincipal deputy director serves under the director, and the deputy director for tribal affairs under the principal deputy director.  On the third and lowest tier of the office rests Training and Technical Assistance, Program Development and Evaluation and Demonstration/Special Projects.

Director
Former Iowa Attorney General Bonnie Campbell was appointed the first director of the Office on Violence Against Women in March 1995.

Diane Stuart became director of the Office on Violence Against Women in October 2001. Stuart had been helping victims of domestic violence since 1989, and she worked as Utah Governor Mike Leavitt's Coordinator for Domestic Violence since 1996. Stuart created Utah's first mobile crisis team; trained police officers would arrive at crime scenes to counsel victims and offer resources.

The 2002 authorization bill for the United States Department of Justice elevated the position to a presidential appointment requiring confirmation by the Senate. The Director serves as the liaison between the Federal, state, tribal, and international governments in regards to matters concerning Violence Against Women (i.e., crimes of domestic violence, sexual assault, dating violence, and stalking). The Director also serves in that role internationally, with Native American tribes in the country, and within other offices of the United States Federal Government.  The Director reports to the Attorney General and is responsible for the legal and policy provisions that are implemented under the Violence Against Women Act. The Director of the Office on Violence Against Women also has ultimate control over all grants, cooperative agreements and contracts that the Office on Violence Against Women issues, and oversees a budget of almost $400 million.

List of directors

Grant programs
The Office on Violence Against Women administers approximately 24 grant programs. Twenty programs use discretionary grant funds and four use formula grant funds. The Office can determine both how discretionary funds will be used and in what context. formula grants are must be distributed according to how the legislation describes. In order to receive funding under the formula grant program, the grant applicant must meet certain standards and qualifications.

Current formula grant programs

Current discretionary grant programs

Formerly authorized grant programs

Activities previously funded by these grant programs are supported by the Consolidated Youth Program.

Besides these specifically mentioned grant programs, the Senate bill that enacted the Violence Against Women Act also created National Domestic Violence Hotline and provided grants for police training and other additional training in the judicial system. The bill also reassessed current laws on prosecuting domestic violence, sexual assault and stalking and provided for the creation of new laws to address gaps in jurisdiction. According to the non-profit organization Break the Cycle, the community focus of many of these grants has made the legislation influential in improving services, advocacy, and responses by criminal justice across the country.

Funding criticisms
There have been critiques of the Office on Violence Against Women. Generally, the criticisms regard the implementation of the Office on Violence Against Women's programs and how effective the programs have been in actually decreasing domestic violence.  While many scholars do not object to the idea of the Violence Against Women Act, some specialists have opinions about to whom, where and how the Office on Violence Against Women should allocate its funding.

A study from the Journal of Marriage and Family stated that the "VAWA does not specifically target funds to areas that are in the greatest need-communities with the most intimate partner violence. Instead of being targeted, such organizations must apply for VAWA funding.  Although some effort has been made to distribute funds to reach the high-need areas and to address specific inadequacies, the funding process currently favors existing organizations.  However, this may not be the most effective way of reaching communities with the greatest need".  The Office on Violence Against Women has taken this criticism under consideration, and is currently in the process of finding new strategies to improve in these areas.

Other critics postulate that the VAWA does not allocate enough resources to men who suffer from domestic violence. There are claims that the Office on Violence Against Women portrays women as the only victims of domestic violence, dating violence, sexual assault, and stalking, while men are solely perpetrators of these crimes. The CDC offers that 13.8% of males have reported abuse, but supporting organizations of the Violence Against Women Act, such as the NNEDV, posit that that number has actually increased up to 37%. Others, including Connie Morella for the National Council of Jewish Women, have said that the Violence Against Women Act does not allocate enough funds or provide assistance to immigrant women, who they say often cannot receive state or federal assistance because of their status.
 Concerned Women for America believe that the Office on Violence Against Women should do more to promote a better image of marriage and healthy relationships and focus on real abuse crimes, instead of using the VAWA to expand the meaning of domestic violence to more trivial cases and leaving less monetary funding and judiciary assistance for the 'real' victims. At present, the Office on Violence Against Women's definition of domestic violence encompasses all forms of abuse, including those of an emotional, economic, psychological, physical and sexual nature.

The reauthorization of the Violence Against Women Act on February 28, 2013 was achieved despite some significant controversy in regards to the new provisions of the Act that include the LGBT community, Native Tribes, and undocumented immigrants. Twenty-two members of the U.S. House of representatives opposed the reauthorization because of the additional provision that protects those minority communities.  However, according to the Centers for Disease Control and Prevention, partners in homosexual relationships say that they have encountered similar or greater levels of domestic violence in their lifetime than their straight counterparts. The 2013 re-authorization of the Violence Against Women Act proved to be more challenging than its last re-authorization in 2005, but the achieved changes focus mostly in who the Violence Against Women Act will now protect and how much money the Act allocates for helping those additional groups.

Challenges

Mandatory arrest laws

While Congress was preparing to reauthorize Violence Against Women Act in 2013, Time published an article arguing that "[d]omestic violence is still a severely under-reported crime and some critics say mandatory arrest policies have exacerbated this problem." Furthermore, in Time Magazine the author concluded that "mandatory arrest laws remove the preferences of abused women from a process that can leave them financially strapped and worried that the state will take custody of their children."

The mandatory arrest policies were established in the original 1994 version of the Violence Against Women Act. These policies encouraged law enforcement to make arrests and move forward with domestic violence cases without the cooperation of victims. Contrary to what Time Magazine states about mandatory arrest provisions, the provisions were removed from Violence Against Women Act in 2000.  While reviewing and reauthorizing the Violence Against Women Act in 2000, Congress changed from "encourage mandatory arrest" policies to "encourage arrest" policies instead, which focus on arresting based on probable cause.

Definition of violence 
In April 2018, OVW changed its definitions of “domestic violence” and “sexual assault." Previously, under the Obama administration, OVW had recognized "forms of emotional, economic, or psychological abuse" within the definition of domestic violence, according to Natalie Nanasi of the Southern Methodist University Dedman School of Law. Now, under the Trump administration, only physical harm that could be prosecuted as a misdemeanor or felony can be considered by OVW as domestic violence. Similarly, whereas sexual assault had previously been defined by OVW as any sexual contact occurring "without the explicit consent of the recipient," now it is limited to only those acts that are already specifically prohibited by "Federal, tribal, or State law." According to Nanasi, the restrictive definitions inhibit OVW from pursuing broader policies to solve the problems of domestic violence and sexual assault.

See also
Dating violence
Domestic violence
Post-assault treatment of sexual assault victims
Rape
Sexual assault
Stalking
United States Associate Attorney General
United States Department of Justice
Violence Against Women Act
Women's rights

References

External links

Further reading

United States Department of Justice agencies
Violence against women in the United States